Domingão do Faustão (literally Big Fausto's Big Sunday) was a Brazilian TV show aired every Sunday from 1989 to 2021. Produced by Rede Globo and hosted by Fausto Silva (also known as Faustão), it featured live music performances (usually by the most popular artists in Brazil at the time) as well as special segments, such as the Dança dos Famosos (Brazilian version of Dancing with the Stars) and Dança no Gelo (Dancing on Ice). It was one of the oldest and most famous of Globo's television shows since its first broadcast in 1989.

History
The series was originally slated to be hosted by Augusto "Gugu" Liberato, who was currently signed with SBT. However, during Carnival in 1988, Gugu signed a lucrative offer with its owner Silvio Santos to stay with SBT and host Sunday programs for the network. Globo quickly hired Faustao Silva—who had hosted the late-night show Perdidos na Noite on Bandeirantes—to host the show instead. Domingão do Fausto would premiere on March 26, 1989, featuring a mix of music, dance performances, and interviews. Its main competitor at launch would be SBT's Programa Silvio Santos.  

In October 1997, Faustão was overtaken in the ratings by another competitor on SBT, Gugu's Domingo Legal; both shows accounted for a total of 60% of Brazilian television viewership on Sundays. By the 2000s, Domingo Legal's viewership began to decline amid a scandal involving Gugu and the PCC.

From 1991 to 1997, Silva also presented a New Year's Eve special for Globo as a spin-off of Domingão, Réveillon do Faustão; it was replaced by the Show da Virada.

In 2008, Domingão celebrated its 1000th episode. In addition to the celebrations, Fausto was congratulated by some personalities, including then president Lula. In 2009, the program celebrated 20 years in the air, promoting the edition Melhores do Ano de 2008 (which was intentionally delayed). In December of that year, the resignation of some members of the cast and production was announced. Among them, Adriana Colin (merchandising), Caçulinha (literally little young brother - musical director) and Lucimara Parisi (director).

On January 25, 2021, the columnist Lauro Jardim announced that the show would be ending in December, after Silva declined an offer by Globo for him to move to a new show on Thursday nights.

On June 13, 2021, Silva missed an episode of Domingão for the first time for medical reasons (citing a urinary tract infection), with Tiago Leifert filling in as guest host. On June 17, Globo announced that Silva had left the network after 35 years, and that Domingão would be succeeded by a new program hosted by Luciano Huck. Leifert would remain as an interim host. 

It was later announced that the Domingão do Faustão title would not be used for this transitional period (thus making the June 13 broadcast its final episode), with the remainder of Super Dança dos Famosos being broadcast as a standalone program with Leifert as host. The program's official replacement, Domingão com Huck, premiered on September 5; the new show carries over segments that were featured on Domingão do Faustão (such as Dança dos Famosos and Show dos Famosos), while also featuring segments that were seen on his Saturday show Caldeirão do Huck (such as Soletrando and The Wall).

Regular segments

Dança dos Famosos

One of the two Brazilian versions of the British competition series Strictly Come Dancing (the other being Record's Dancing Brasil, which is licensed specifically from its U.S. adaptation Dancing with the Stars), the show pairs a number of celebrities with professional ballroom dancers.
Season Chronology

Show dos Famosos 

Based on the Spanish format Your Face Sounds Familiar, the series features celebrities performing as randomly-selected musicians.

Melhores do Ano
Melhores do Ano is an event promoted by the program to reward the best artists of the year.
2015 edition

{| class="wikitable" width="100%"
|-
! style="background:#ABCDEF;" width="50%" | Best Actor of Telenovela
! style="background:#ABCDEF;" width="50%" | Best Actress of Telenovela
|-
 | valign="top" |
Alexandre Nero - (A Regra do Jogo)
Rafael Cardoso - (Além do Tempo)
Rodrigo Lombardi - (Verdades Secretas)
 | valign="top" |
Giovanna Antonelli - (A Regra do Jogo)
Alinne Moraes - (Além do Tempo)
Drica Moraes - (Verdades Secretas)
|-
! style="background:#ABCDEF;" |Best Supporting Actor
! style="background:#ABCDEF;" |Best Supporting Actress 
|-
 | valign="top" |
Rainer Cadete - (Verdades Secretas)
Juliano Cazarré - (A Regra do Jogo)
Tonico Pereira - (A Regra do Jogo)
 | valign="top" |
Grazi Massafera - (Verdades Secretas)
Bruna Linzmeyer - (A Regra do Jogo)
Cássia Kis - (A Regra do Jogo)
|-
! style="background:#ABCDEF;" |Best Revelation Actor
! style="background:#ABCDEF;" |Best Revelation Actress
|-
 | valign="top" |
Rafael Vitti - (Malhação)
Gabriel Leone - (Verdades Secretas)
Mauricio Destri - (I Love Paraisópolis) 
 | valign="top" |
Isabella Santoni - (Malhação)
Agatha Moreira - (Verdades Secretas)
Camila Queiroz - (Verdades Secretas)
|-
! style="background:#ABCDEF;" width="50%" | Best Actor of Series
! style="background:#ABCDEF;" width="50%" | Best Actress of Series
|-
 | valign="top" |
Vladimir Brichta - (Tapas & Beijos)
 - (Felizes para Sempre?)
Lázaro Ramos - (Mister Brau) 
 | valign="top" |
Paolla Oliveira - (Felizes para Sempre?) 
Fernanda Torres - (Tapas & Beijos)
Taís Araújo - (Mister Brau) 
|-
! style="background:#ABCDEF;" |ComedyFaustão conversa com Leandro Hassum e Rodrigo Sant'anna 
! style="background:#ABCDEF;" |Best Children Actress/ActorComeça o Melhores do Ano 2015 e Faustão anuncia primeiro prêmio 
|-
 | valign="top" |Rodrigo Sant'Anna - (Zorra)
Leandro Hassum - (Chapa Quente)
Marcelo Adnet - (Tá no Ar)
 | valign="top" |Mel Maia - (Além do Tempo)
João Gabriel D'Aleluia - (Além do Tempo)
Sabrina Nonata - (Babilônia)
|-
! style="background:#ABCDEF;" |Best Male SingerLuan Santana, Lucas Lucco e Thiaguinho falam sobre prêmio 
! style="background:#ABCDEF;" |Best Female SingerFaustão conversa com Anitta, Claudia Leitte e Ivete Sangalo 
|-
 | valign="top" |Luan SantanaLucas Lucco
Thiaguinho
 | valign="top" |AnittaClaudia Leitte 
Ivete Sangalo 
|-
! style="background:#ABCDEF;" |Song of YearFaustão conversa com Tiê, Luan Santana e Ludmilla 
! style="background:#ABCDEF;" |Best Journalism Faustão conversa com as concorrentes na categoria Jornalismo 
|-
 | valign="top" |"Hoje" - (Ludmilla)
"A Noite" - (Tiê) 
"Escreve Aí" - (Luan Santana)
| valign="top" |Renata Vasconcellos' - (Jornal Nacional)
Maria Júlia Coutinho - (Jornal Nacional) 
Sandra Annenberg - (Jornal Hoje)
|-
|}

Impact

RatingsDomingão debuted with a central objective: to surpass the audience of the popular Programa Silvio Santos (SBT). According to IBOPE, some affiliated stations SBT recorded 60 rating points during program airing, an easy win for Globo. Soon after the premiere, Domingão, broadcast during prime time on Sunday, between 4:00 pm and 19:00 pm, scored 36 points average, compared to 20 for Silvio Santos in São Paulo. In Rio de Janeiro, it was 36 points for 'Domingão' versus 16 points for TV Manchete.

The program remained leader for 8 consecutive years (which made the media call Fausto the King of  Sundays), until the SBT launched Domingo Legal, a similar program presented by Augusto Liberato, who quickly became popular and took over the leadership of IBOPE ratings. The loss of ratings forced Fausto and his production team to appeal to alternatives, such as the controversial segment Sushi Erótico (Erotic Sushi). However, the program still lost more audience and popularity, and Domingo Legal continued to grow. However, some years later, the rival program would lose popularity, after displaying a false report in which alleged members of the PCC threatened the death of some of Brazil's media personalities.Entrevista com supostos bandidos do PCC põe Gugu em maus lençóis com a Justiça Later, Fausto again lead the IBOPE Ratings.

Fausto continued to lead the public by the end of the 2000s (even considering the boom of Rede TV! which did not affect Domingão directly). However, in 2010, Fausto returned to facing problems with the audience. Gugu, who moved to TV Record a year earlier, began broadcasting its program in the new station simultaneously, and performed well in the ratings, and beat Fausto several times.Briga no domingo na TV é entre Gugu e Faustão 

In 2011, Domingão recorded its worst audience: 10 points on average, according to IBOPE Media Information''. At some times of the day, Fausto came in third place, surpassed by Gugu (Record) and Eliana (SBT).

References

External links
 The official page of the program

Rede Globo original programming
1989 Brazilian television series debuts
1980s Brazilian television series
1990s Brazilian television series
2000s Brazilian television series
2010s Brazilian television series
2020s Brazilian television series
2021 Brazilian television series endings
Portuguese-language television shows